Long intergenic non-protein coding RNA 926 is a protein that in humans is encoded by the LINC00926 gene.

References

Further reading